Kluyvera is a Gram negative, facultatively anaerobic bacterial and motile genus from the family of Enterobacteriaceae which have peritrichous flagella. Kluyvera occur in water, soil and sewage. Kluyvera bacteria can cause opportunistic infections in immunocompromised patients.

Etymology 
The etymology of this genera is the following : Kluy’ver.a. N.L. fem. n. Kluyvera, named given by Asai et al.  in 1956 to honor the Dutch microbiologist A.J. Kluyver.

Transference of antibiotic resistance 
In 2010, a gene blaCTX-M-15 responsible for coding CTX-M-15 extended-spectrum β-lactamase (ESBL) jumped from its chromosome to its plasmid, which was then shared among several bacteria. ESBL confers resistance to pathogenic bacterial strains. This caused the development of antibiotic resistance in almost all known pathogenic bacteria at that time.

References

Further reading 
 
 
 

Enterobacteriaceae
Bacteria genera